Adam Goodman is an American film industry executive, television producer, and film producer. He previously served as President of Paramount Pictures and currently is the owner of Dichotomy, a film production company, and Invisible Narratives, a digital studio.

Early career 
Goodman started working in motion pictures while still in high school. Before joining DreamWorks Pictures as an assistant, Goodman worked as a production assistant on films produced by one of Hollywood's most successful producers, John Hughes.

Career 
Goodman served as President of Paramount Motion Picture Group from 2009 to 2015. While at Paramount, he   shepherded a number of key projects for the company. Some of the films that he helped bring to the screen include the “Teenage Mutant Ninja Turtles” reboot, “Mission:Impossible – Ghost Protocol” and the “Paranormal Activity” franchise. During his tenure, Paramount also rebooted "Star Trek" with J.J. Abrams and launched a series of films based on "G.I. Joe." The company weathered a third-act reshoot on "World War Z" to turn it into a $540 million global hit.

In early 2016, Goodman exited Paramount at a time when the studio was struggling with a thin film slate. He was replaced by Marc Evans as President.

Shortly after departing from Paramount, Goodman formed his own film production company, Dichotomy.Dichotomy plans to focus on a low-budget model to finance a myriad of genres over time, in increments.

Goodman has also gone on to start a digital content studio called Invisible Narratives, focused on connecting the largest social creators with Hollywood filmmakers and brands.

References 

Year of birth missing (living people)
Living people
American film producers